Phrynocephalus putjatai is a species of agamid lizard found in China.

References

putjatai
Reptiles described in 1909
Taxa named by Jacques von Bedriaga